Tuan Forest is a coastal locality split between the Gympie Region and the Fraser Coast Region, both in Queensland, Australia.

The undeveloped town of Tawan is within the locality within the Fraser Coast Region.

Geography
The Great Sandy Strait forms part of the eastern boundary.

References

Gympie Region
Fraser Coast Region
Coastline of Queensland
Localities in Queensland